The Barry University School of Podiatric Medicine is one of the nine podiatric medical schools in the United States. It is located in Miami Shores, Florida.  The school was founded in 1985 as the first podiatric medical college to be part of a university.  It is one of several schools of Barry University.

Barry University School of Podiatric Medicine has graduated more than 1000 podiatric physicians since its inception in 1985. The Center for Community Health and Minority Medicine, the first of several medical sciences facilities for the Doctor in Podiatry and Physician Assistant Master students, began construction in 2007. A short walk west from the main campus, it is currently the new location of Barry University's School of Podiatric medicine. The school has affiliations with such Miami hospitals as: Mount Sinai Medical Center & Miami Heart Institute, Mercy Hospital, DVA Miami, North Shore Medical Center and Jackson Memorial Hospital.  The Dean of the school is Bryan Caldwell, DPM, MD.

External links
Barry University School of Podiatric Medicine

Podiatric medical schools in the United States
Educational institutions established in 1985
Barry University
Catholic health care
1985 establishments in Florida